Yu Saichang (1923 – 2008) was a Chinese basketball player. He competed in the men's tournament at the 1948 Summer Olympics.

References

External links
 

1923 births
2008 deaths
Chinese men's basketball players
Olympic basketball players of China
Basketball players at the 1948 Summer Olympics
Place of birth missing
Republic of China men's national basketball team players